Cameron York (born January 5, 2001) is an American professional ice hockey defenseman for the  Philadelphia Flyers of the National Hockey League (NHL). He was drafted 14th overall by the Flyers in the first round of the 2019 NHL Entry Draft. Before being selected by the Flyers, York played ice hockey at Shattuck-St. Mary's and in the U.S. National Development Program.

Playing career

Early career
York was born and raised in Anaheim, California. Growing up there, he played alongside Jackson Niedermayer, the son of Scott Niedermayer, who coached his youth hockey team. His father, Jeff, installed a roller skating rink surface in the backyard which York would skate on every day after school. It was through roller skating that York developed an affinity for hockey. After two defencemen on his youth team were injured, he was placed on defence and enjoyed the position. York played squirt and peewee hockey within the Anaheim Jr. Ducks minor program coached by Craig Johnson and Scott Niedermayer.

Once he turned 14, York enrolled in Shattuck-St. Mary's, a Minnesota prep academy, where he totaled more than 100 points in two seasons. Afterwards, York was invited to the USA Hockey National Team Development Program in the USHL. While playing for the USA Hockey National Team Development Program U-18 team in the 2018–19 USHL season, York set a new single season record for points for a defenseman.  On January 15, 2019, York set a new franchise record for most points in one game with seven. This earned him USHL's Defenseman of the Week Honors.

York was initially committed to play for Boston College, but rescinded his commitment when coach Greg Brown left to join the New York Rangers. He eventually committed to play for the University of Michigan Wolverines.

Collegiate
York was drafted 14th overall by the Philadelphia Flyers in the first round of the 2019 NHL Entry Draft. He enrolled in the University of Michigan for the 2019–20 season and recorded his first collegiate goal in a 2–1 loss to Ohio State on November 2, 2019. 

During the 2020–21 season, York led the Big Ten in defenseman scoring with 20 points on four goals and 16 assists. Five of his 20 points came on the power play, while four of his assists set up game-winning goals. Following an outstanding season, he was named Big Ten Defensive Player of the Year and First Team All-Big Ten.

Professional
On March 31, 2021, the Flyers signed York to a three-year, entry-level contract. York made his NHL debut on May 7 in the Flyers' 4–2 win over the Washington Capitals. On January 8, 2022, York recorded his first NHL point with an assist to James van Riemsdyk as the Flyers won 3–2 in overtime against the San Jose Sharks. He scored his first NHL goal in a 3–2 loss to the New York Rangers on January 15.

International play

On April 4, 2018, York was selected to compete for Team USA at the 2018 IIHF World U18 Championships. He recorded 6 points and was named to the Media All-Star Team as Team USA won a silver medal.

York was again selected to compete for Team USA at the 2019 IIHF World U18 Championships on April 11, 2019. During the tournament, he set a new scoring record for defenseman in U18 Men's World Championship history. His 17 points collected during the 2018 and 19 series helped earn him the honor of Three Best Players of the tournament for Team USA, U.S. Player of the Game, and a bronze medal.

Career statistics

Regular season and playoffs

International

Awards and honors

References

External links
 

2001 births
Living people
AHCA Division I men's ice hockey All-Americans
American men's ice hockey defensemen
Ice hockey players from California
Lehigh Valley Phantoms players
Michigan Wolverines men's ice hockey players
National Hockey League first-round draft picks
People from Anaheim Hills, California
Philadelphia Flyers draft picks
Philadelphia Flyers players
USA Hockey National Team Development Program players